Under the Blue Moon is the fourth studio album by American R&B boy band New Edition by MCA on November 24, 1986. Their fourth album and third with MCA and first album after New Edition member Bobby Brown was voted out of the group, the group was going through a transitional phase during this period. It is their only album as a quartet. The album reached number 43 on the Billboard 200, and number 18 on the R&B albums chart. It was later certified gold by the Recording Industry Association of America (RIAA).

Overview

History
New Edition recorded their cover version of "Earth Angel" for the soundtrack to the 1986 film The Karate Kid Part II.  
At the time of its recording, the cover was intended to be a one-off endeavor, but the popularity of the film and its soundtrack helped make the song a minor chart hit.  This spawned the idea for the group to record an entire album of covers of popular doo-wop songs.

Release and reaction
The album went gold primarily because of the airplay received by "Earth Angel" and marked the end of the group's management and production obligation to Jump & Shoot Productions, leaving them free to sign a subsequent new deal directly with MCA Records.

In the UK, the album was released under the title "Earth Angel" on February 16, 1987.

Track listing
All tracks produced by Freddie Perren; except "Bring Back the Memories" produced by Ric  Wyatt, Jr.

Personnel
New Edition
Ricky Bell - vocals
Michael Bivins - vocals
Ronnie DeVoe - vocals
Ralph Tresvant - vocals

Charts

Certifications

References

1986 albums
New Edition albums
Albums produced by Freddie Perren
MCA Records albums
Covers albums